Jelena Miholjević (born 27 September 1969) is a Croatian actress. She appeared in more than thirty films since 1988.

Selected filmography

References

External links 

1969 births
Living people
Actresses from Zagreb
Croatian film actresses